Janmar is a subdivision in North Dallas, Texas.

Janmar was developed from 1953 to 1960. It was named after Janet and Margaret, the daughters of the developer. Many of the houses have contemporary architecture. The Round House, which opened in 1962, is located in Janmar. The Round House was under construction for eight years.

Education
Janmar residents are located in the Dallas Independent School District. It is zoned to Arthur Kramer Elementary School, Ben Franklin Middle School, and Hillcrest High School. In 2009 D Magazine stated that many people buying property in the neighborhood are interested in sending their children to the local public schools.

References

Neighborhoods in Dallas